The Taipei Mission in Sweden represents the interests of Taiwan in Sweden in the absence of formal diplomatic relations, functioning as a de facto embassy. Its counterpart in Taiwan is the Swedish Trade and Invest Council in Taipei. The office also handles affairs in Norway after the Taipei Representative Office in Norway closed on 30 September 2017.

History
Sweden established official diplomatic relations with the People's Republic of China in 1950, which required the Swedish government to break off relations with the government in Taiwan.

The Taipei Mission was established as the Taipei Trade, Tourism and Information Office in 1981 and renamed to Taipei Mission in Sweden in 1994.

Organizational structures
 Political Division
 Consular Division
 Education Division
 Economic Division

Representatives
 Lee Chen-jan (2014–2016)
  (2016–2020)
  (2020–)

See also
 List of diplomatic missions of Taiwan
 List of diplomatic missions in Sweden

References

External links
 Taipei Mission in Sweden

Taiwan 
Sweden
1981 establishments in Sweden
Diplomatic missions in Stockholm
Organizations established in 1981
Sweden–Taiwan relations